The Iran International Neuroscience Institute (Persian: بنیاد علمی بین‌المللی علوم مغز و اعصاب ایران) or Iran INI (Persian: آی‌ان‌آی ایران) is an International research centre and hospital located in Tehran, Iran. It is the largest centre of Neuroscience researches in the world and third version of its own kind that was founded by professor Majid Samii. The first INI is in Hanover of Germany. The construction has started since 2010 and it is estimated that it will be finished by 2019.

See also
List of hospitals in Iran

References

Buildings and structures under construction
Hospitals in Iran
Medical research institutes in Iran
Neuroscience research centers in Iran
Hospitals established in 2019